Korsun is an East Slavic surname. Notable people with the surname include:

 Anna Korsun (born 1986), Ukrainian musician and teacher
 Hanna Korsun (born 1991), Ukrainian singer known as Maruv
 Nikolai Georgiyevich Korsun (1876–1958), Soviet military historian
 Nikolai Nesterovich Korsun (1911–1988), Soviet army officer

See also
 

Ukrainian-language surnames